GT Global (formerly Grupo Tampico) is one of the largest companies in northeastern Mexico. It is located in Tampico, Tamaulipas. GT Global's main products are Finance, automobiles, plastics and tourism services.

History

GT Global (formerly Grupo Tampico) began in 1912 as "La Pureza", a soft drink company, under the leadership of Leo Fleishman. His son H. H. Fleishman led the development of the second-generation companies of the group. He also negotiated with The Coca-Cola Company so that, in 1926, Tampico became the first city in Mexico to bottle Coca-Cola.

His son, H. H. "Jack" Fleishman, later continued with the growth and diversification of the third-generation companies of Grupo Tampico. Today, Herman H. Fleishman, a son of H. H. "Jack", is the President and CEO of GT Global while his brother, Robert A. Fleishman is Vice President and Chief Operating Officer.

GT Global is today, with its leading brands of products and services, one of the most important business organizations in northeastern Mexico, with a presence in the states of Tamaulipas, Veracruz, San Luis Potosí, Jalisco, Nuevo León, Coahuila and the State of Mexico.

In 2006 GT Global opened a new Coca-Cola bottling plant in Altamira, named La Pureza after the original name of GT Global which Leo Fleishman founded in 1912.

On 29 June 2011, was announced that FEMSA will merge to the bottling division of Grupo Tampico, agreeing to pay $9.3 billion pesos ($790 million dollars) in stock for the Coca-Cola bottling operations of Grupo Tampico.

Divisions of GT Global

Automotive
Megamotors Tampico (Chrysler, Dodge, Jeep and Ram)
Megamotors Madero (Chrysler, Dodge, Jeep and Ram)
Mercedes-Benz Tampico
Mitsubishi Motors
Toyota
Megamotors Trucks (Mercedes-Benz)
Mazda

Tourism
Camino Real
Mansión Real
Interviajes
Thrifty Tampico

Plastics
Plásticos Panamericanos
 GT Plastics norte

Services
Club de Industriales
Águila Seguridad
Almacenes Miramar
Aerotaxi

Finance
GT Credit

Real Estate
Altama

References

External links
Official Site

Conglomerate companies established in 1912
Companies based in Tampico, Tamaulipas
Car manufacturers of Mexico
Food and drink companies of Mexico
Manufacturing companies of Mexico
Privately held companies of Mexico
Food and drink companies established in 1912
Vehicle manufacturing companies established in 1912
Transport companies established in 1912
Truck manufacturers of Mexico
Mexican companies established in 1912